The Supermarine Spitfire is a British single-seat fighter aircraft used by the Royal Air Force and other Allied countries before, during, and after World War II. Many variants of the Spitfire were built, from the Mk 1 to the Rolls-Royce Griffon-engined Mk 24 using several wing configurations and guns. It was the only British fighter produced continuously throughout the war. The Spitfire remains popular among enthusiasts; around 70 remain airworthy, and many more are static exhibits in aviation museums throughout the world.

The Spitfire was designed as a short-range, high-performance interceptor aircraft by R. J. Mitchell, chief designer at Supermarine Aviation Works, which operated as a subsidiary of Vickers-Armstrong from 1928. Mitchell developed the Spitfire's distinctive elliptical wing (designed by Beverley Shenstone) with innovative sunken rivets  to have the thinnest possible cross-section, achieving a potential top speed greater than that of several contemporary fighter aircraft, including the Hawker Hurricane. Mitchell continued to refine the design until his death in 1937, whereupon his colleague Joseph Smith took over as chief designer, overseeing the Spitfire's development through many variants.

During the Battle of Britain (July–October 1940), the public perceived the Spitfire to be the main RAF fighter;  however, the more numerous Hurricane shouldered more of the burden of resisting the Luftwaffe. Nevertheless, the Spitfire was a better fighter aircraft than the Hurricane. Spitfire units had a lower attrition rate and a higher victory-to-loss ratio than those flying Hurricanes, probably because of the Spitfire's higher performance metrics. During the battle, Spitfires generally engaged Luftwaffe fighters—mainly Messerschmitt Bf 109E-series aircraft, which were a close match for them.

After the Battle of Britain, the Spitfire superseded the Hurricane as the principal aircraft of RAF Fighter Command, and it was used in the European, Mediterranean, Pacific, and Southeast Asian theatres. Much loved by its pilots, the Spitfire operated in several roles, including interceptor, photo-reconnaissance, fighter-bomber, and trainer, and it continued to do so until the 1950s. The Seafire was an aircraft carrier–based adaptation of the Spitfire, used in the Fleet Air Arm from 1942 until the mid-1950s. The original airframe was designed to be powered by a Rolls-Royce Merlin engine producing 1,030 hp (768 kW). It was strong enough and adaptable enough to use increasingly powerful Merlins,  and in later marks, Rolls-Royce Griffon engines producing up to 2,340 hp (1,745 kW). As a result, the Spitfire's performance and capabilities improved over the course of its service life.

Development and production

Origins

R. J. Mitchell designed the Supermarine Type 224 to fill this role. It made its first flight in February 1934. Of the seven designs tendered to F7/30, the Gloster Gladiator biplane was accepted for service.

The Type 224 was a big disappointment to Mitchell and his design team, who immediately embarked on a series of "cleaned-up" designs, using their experience with the Schneider Trophy seaplanes as a starting point. This design was submitted to the Air Ministry in July 1934, but was not accepted. It then went through a series of changes, including the incorporation of an enclosed cockpit, oxygen-breathing apparatus, smaller and thinner wings, and the newly developed, more powerful Rolls-Royce PV-XII V-12 engine, which was later named the "Merlin". In November 1934, Mitchell, with the backing of Supermarine's owner Vickers-Armstrong, started detailed design work on this refined version of the Type 300.

On 1 December 1934, the Air Ministry issued contract AM 361140/34, providing £10,000 for the construction of Mitchell's improved Type 300 design. On 3 January 1935, they formalised the contract with a new specification, F10/35, written around the aircraft. In April 1935, the armament was changed from two .303 in (7.7 mm) Vickers machine guns in each wing to four .303 in (7.7 mm) Brownings, following a recommendation by Squadron Leader Ralph Sorley of the Operational Requirements section at the Air Ministry.

On 5 March 1936, the prototype (K5054), fitted with a fine-pitch propeller to give more power for takeoff, took off on its first flight from Eastleigh Aerodrome (later Southampton Airport). At the controls was Captain Joseph "Mutt" Summers, chief test pilot for Vickers, who is quoted as saying, "don't touch anything" on landing. This eight-minute flight came four months after the maiden flight of the contemporary Hurricane.

K5054 was fitted with a new propeller, and Summers flew the aircraft on 10 March 1936; during this flight, the undercarriage was retracted for the first time. After the fourth flight, a new engine was fitted, and Summers left the test flying to his assistants, Jeffrey Quill and George Pickering. They soon discovered that the Spitfire was a very capable aircraft, but not perfect. The rudder was oversensitive, and the top speed was just 330 mph (528 km/h), little faster than Sydney Camm's new Merlin-powered Hurricane. A new and better-shaped, two-bladed, wooden propeller allowed the Spitfire to reach 348 mph (557 km/h) in level flight in mid-May, when Summers flew K5054 to RAF Martlesham Heath and handed the aircraft over to Squadron Leader Anderson of the Aeroplane & Armament Experimental Establishment (A&AEE). Here, Flight Lieutenant Humphrey Edwardes-Jones took over the prototype for the RAF. He had been given orders to fly the aircraft and then to make his report to the Air Ministry on landing. Edwardes-Jones' report was positive; his only request was that the Spitfire be equipped with an undercarriage position indicator. A week later, on 3 June 1936, the Air Ministry placed an order for 310 Spitfires, before the A&AEE had issued any formal report. Interim reports were later issued on a piecemeal basis.

Initial production
The British public first saw the Spitfire at the RAF Hendon air display on Saturday 27 June 1936. Although full-scale production was supposed to begin immediately, numerous problems could not be overcome for some time, and the first production Spitfire, K9787, did not roll off the Woolston, Southampton assembly line until mid-1938.

In February 1936, the director of Vickers-Armstrongs, Sir Robert MacLean guaranteed production of five aircraft a week, beginning 15 months after an order was placed. On 3 June 1936, the Air Ministry placed an order for 310 aircraft, at a cost of £1,395,000. Full-scale production of the Spitfire began at Supermarine's facility in Woolston, but the order clearly could not be completed in the 15 months promised. Supermarine was a small company, already busy building Walrus and Stranraer flying boats, and Vickers was busy building Wellington bombers.

The initial solution was to subcontract the work. Although outside contractors were supposed to be involved in manufacturing many important Spitfire components, especially the wings, Vickers-Armstrongs (the parent company) was reluctant to see the Spitfire being manufactured by outside concerns, and was slow to release the necessary blueprints and subcomponents.

As a result of the delays in getting the Spitfire into full production, the Air Ministry put forward a plan that its production be stopped after the initial order for 310, after which Supermarine would build Bristol Beaufighters. The managements of Supermarine and Vickers were able to convince the Air Ministry that production problems could be overcome, and a further order was placed for 200 Spitfires on 24 March 1938. The two orders covered the K, L, and N prefix serial numbers.

The first production Spitfire came off the assembly line in mid-1938 and was flown by Jeffrey Quill on 15 May 1938, almost 24 months after the initial order. The final cost of the first 310 aircraft, after delays and increased programme costs, came to £1,870,242 or £1,533 more per aircraft than originally estimated. A production aircraft cost about £9,500. The most expensive components were the hand-fabricated and finished fuselage at roughly £2,500, then the Rolls-Royce Merlin engine at £2,000, followed by the wings at £1,800 a pair, guns and undercarriage, both at £800 each, and the propeller at £350.

Manufacturing at Castle Bromwich, Birmingham

In 1935, the Air Ministry approached Morris Motors Limited to ask how quickly their Cowley plant could be turned to aircraft production. In 1936, this informal request for major manufacturing facilities was replaced by a formal scheme, known as the shadow factory plan, to boost British aircraft production capacity under the leadership of Herbert Austin. He was given the task of building nine new factories, and to supplement the British car-manufacturing industry by either adding to overall capacity or increasing the potential for reorganisation to produce aircraft and their engines.

In 1938, construction began on the Castle Bromwich Aircraft Factory (CBAF), next to the aerodrome, and the installation of the most modern machine tools then available began two months after work started on the site. Although Morris Motors, under Lord Nuffield (an expert in mass motor-vehicle construction), managed and equipped the factory, it was funded by the government. By the beginning of 1939, the factory's original estimated cost of £2,000,000 had more than doubled, and even as the first Spitfires were being built in June 1940, the factory was still incomplete, and suffering from personnel problems. The Spitfire's stressed-skin construction required precision engineering skills and techniques that were beyond the capabilities of the local labour force, and some time was required to retrain them. Difficulties arose with management, who ignored Supermarine's tooling and drawings in favour of their own, and the workforce continually threatened strikes or "slow downs" until their demands for higher wages were met.

In spite of promises that the factory would be producing 60 per week starting in April, by May 1940, Castle Bromwich had not yet built its first Spitfire. On 17 May, Minister of Aircraft Production Lord Beaverbrook telephoned Lord Nuffield and manoeuvred him into handing over control of the Castle Bromwich plant to his ministry. Beaverbrook immediately sent in experienced management staff and workers from Supermarine, and gave control of the factory to Vickers-Armstrongs. Although resolving the problems took time, in June 1940, 10 Mk IIs were built; 23 rolled out in July, 37 in August, and 56 in September. By the time production ended at Castle Bromwich in June 1945, a total of 12,129 Spitfires (921 Mk IIs, 4,489 Mk Vs, 5,665 Mk IXs, and 1,054 Mk XVIs) had been built, at a maximum rate of 320 per month, making CBAF the largest Spitfire factory in the UK and the largest and most successful plant of its type during the 1939–45 conflict.

Production dispersal

During the Battle of Britain, the Luftwaffe made concerted efforts to destroy the main manufacturing plants at Woolston and Itchen, near Southampton. The first bombing raid, which missed the factories, came on 23 August 1940. Over the next month, other raids were mounted, until, on 26 September 1940, both factories were destroyed, with 92 people killed and a large number injured. Most of the casualties were experienced aircraft-production workers.

Fortunately for the future of the Spitfire, many of the production jigs and machine tools had already been relocated by 20 September, and steps were being taken to disperse production to small facilities throughout the Southampton area. To this end, the British government requisitioned the likes of Vincent's Garage in Station Square, Reading, which later specialised in manufacturing Spitfire fuselages, and Anna Valley Motors, Salisbury, which was to become the sole producer of the wing leading-edge fuel tanks for photo-reconnaissance Spitfires, as well as producing other components.

A purpose-built works, specialising in manufacturing fuselages and installing engines, was built at Star Road, Caversham in Reading. The drawing office in which all Spitfire designs were drafted was moved to Hursley Park, near Southampton. This site also had an aircraft assembly hangar where many prototype and experimental Spitfires were assembled, but since it had no associated aerodrome, no Spitfires ever flew from Hursley.

Four towns and their satellite airfields were chosen to be the focal points for these workshops: Southampton's Eastleigh Airport; Salisbury and the High Post and Chattis Hill aerodromes; Trowbridge and RAF Keevil; and Reading's Henley and Aldermaston aerodromes. Completed Spitfires were delivered to the airfields on Commer "Queen Mary" low-loader trailers, there to be fully assembled, tested, then passed on to the RAF. An experimental factory at Newbury was the subject of a Luftwaffe daylight raid, but the bombs missed their target and hit a nearby school.

Flight testing
All production aircraft were flight tested before delivery. During the Second World War, Jeffrey Quill was Vickers Supermarine's chief test pilot, in charge of flight testing all aircraft types built by Vickers Supermarine. He oversaw a group of 10 to 12 pilots responsible for testing all developmental and production Spitfires built by the company in the Southampton area. Quill devised the standard testing procedures, which with variations for specific aircraft designs operated from 1938. Alex Henshaw, chief test pilot at Castle Bromwich from 1940, was placed in charge of testing all Spitfires built at that factory. He co-ordinated a team of 25 pilots and assessed all Spitfire developments. Between 1940 and 1946, Henshaw flew a total of 2,360 Spitfires and Seafires, more than 10% of total production.

Henshaw wrote about flight testing Spitfires:
After a thorough preflight check, I would take off, and once at circuit height, I would trim the aircraft and try to get her to fly straight and level with hands off the stick ... Once the trim was satisfactory, I would take the Spitfire up in a full-throttle climb at 2,850 rpm to the rated altitude of one or both supercharger blowers. Then I would make a careful check of the power output from the engine, calibrated for height and temperature ... If all appeared satisfactory, I would then put her into a dive at full power and 3,000 rpm, and trim her to fly hands and feet off at  IAS (Indicated Air Speed). Personally, I never cleared a Spitfire unless I had carried out a few aerobatic tests to determine how good or bad she was.
The production test was usually quite a brisk affair; the initial circuit lasted less than 10 minutes and the main flight took between 20 and 30 minutes. Then, the aircraft received a final once-over by our ground mechanics, any faults were rectified, and the Spitfire was ready for collection.
I loved the Spitfire in all of her many versions, but I have to admit that the later marks, although they were faster than the earlier ones, were also much heavier, so did not handle so well. You did not have such positive control over them. One test of manoeuvrability was to throw her into a flick-roll and see how many times she rolled. With the Mark II or the Mark V one got two-and-a-half flick-rolls, but the Mark IX was heavier and you got only one-and-a-half. With the later and still heavier versions, one got even less. The essence of aircraft design is compromise, and an improvement at one end of the performance envelope is rarely achieved without a deterioration somewhere else.Price and Spick 1997, p. 70.

When the last Spitfire rolled out in February 1948, a total of 20,351 examples of all variants had been built, including two-seat trainers, with some Spitfires remaining in service well into the 1950s. The Spitfire was the only British fighter aircraft to be in continuous production before, during, and after the Second World War.

Design

Airframe

In the mid-1930s, aviation design teams worldwide began developing a new generation of fighter aircraft. The French Dewoitine D.520 and the German Messerschmitt Bf 109, for example, were designed to take advantage of new techniques of monocoque construction, and the availability of new, high-powered, liquid-cooled, in-line aero engines. They also featured refinements such as retractable undercarriages, fully enclosed cockpits, and low-drag, all-metal wings. These advances had been introduced on civil airliners years before, but were slow to be adopted by the military, who favoured the biplane's simplicity and manoeuvrability.

Mitchell's design aims were to create a well-balanced, high-performance fighter aircraft capable of fully exploiting the power of the Merlin engine, while being relatively easy to fly. At the time, with France as an ally, and Germany thought to be the most likely future opponent, no enemy fighters were expected to appear over Great Britain. German bombers would have to fly to the UK over the North Sea, and Germany did not have any single-engine fighters with the range to accompany them. To carry out the mission of home defence, the design was intended to allow the Spitfire to climb quickly to intercept enemy bombers.

The Spitfire's airframe was complex. The streamlined, semi-monocoque, duralumin-skinned fuselage had a number of compound curves built up over a skeleton of 19 formers, also known as frames. These started from frame number one, immediately behind the propeller unit, to the tail unit attachment frame. The first four frames supported the glycol header tank and engine cowlings. Frame five, to which the engine bearers were secured, supported the weight of the engine and its accessories. This was a strengthened double frame which also incorporated the fireproof bulkhead, and in later versions of the Spitfire, the oil tank. This frame also tied the four main fuselage longerons to the rest of the airframe. Behind the bulkhead were five U-shaped half-frames which accommodated the fuel tanks and cockpit. The rear fuselage started at the 11th frame, to which the pilot's seat and (later) armour plating were attached, and ended at the 19th, which was mounted at a slight forward angle just forward of the fin. Each of these nine frames was oval, reducing in size towards the tail, and incorporated several lightening holes to reduce their weight as much as possible without weakening them. The U-shaped frame 20 was the last frame of the fuselage proper and the frame to which the tail unit was attached. Frames 21, 22 and 23 formed the fin; frame 22 incorporated the tailwheel opening and frame 23 was the rudder post. Before being attached to the main fuselage, the tail unit frames were held in a jig and the eight horizontal tail formers were riveted to them.

A combination of 14 longitudinal stringers and four main longerons attached to the frames helped form a light but rigid structure to which sheets of alclad stressed skinning were attached. The fuselage plating was 24, 20, and 18 gauge, decreasing in o thickness towards the tail, while the fin structure was completed using short longerons from frames 20 to 23, before being covered in 22 gauge plating.

The skin of the fuselage, wings, and tailplane was secured by dome-headed rivets, and in critical areas such as the wing forward of the main spar where an uninterrupted airflow was required, with flush rivets. From February 1943 flush riveting was used on the fuselage, affecting all Spitfire variants. In some areas, such as at the rear of the wing and the lower tailplane skins, the top was riveted and the bottom fixed by brass screws which tapped into strips of spruce bolted to the lower ribs. The removable wing tips were made up of duralumin-skinned spruce formers.

At first, the ailerons, elevators, and rudder were fabric-covered, but once combat experience showed that fabric-covered ailerons were impossible to use at high speeds a light alloy replaced the fabric, enhancing control throughout the speed range.

Elliptical wing design

In 1934, Mitchell and the design staff decided to use a semi-elliptical wing shape to solve two conflicting requirements; the wing needed to be thin to avoid creating too much drag, but it had to be thick enough to house the retractable undercarriage, armament, and ammunition. An elliptical planform is the most efficient aerodynamic shape for an untwisted wing, leading to the lowest amount of induced drag. The ellipse was skewed so that the centre of pressure, which occurs at the quarter-chord position, aligned with the main spar, preventing the wings from twisting. Mitchell has sometimes been accused of copying the wing shape of the Günter brothers-designed Heinkel He 70, which first flew in 1932, but as Beverley Shenstone, the aerodynamicist on Mitchell's team, explained: "Our wing was much thinner and had quite a different section to that of the Heinkel. In any case, it would have been simply asking for trouble to have copied a wing shape from an aircraft designed for an entirely different purpose."

The wing section used was from the NACA 2200 series, which had been adapted to create a thickness-to-chord ratio of 13% at the root, reducing to 9.4% at the tip. A dihedral of 6° was adopted to give increased lateral stability.

A wing feature that contributed greatly to its success was an innovative spar boom design, made up of five square tubes that fitted into each other. As the wing thinned out along its span, the tubes were progressively cut away in a similar fashion to a leaf spring; two of these booms were linked together by an alloy web, creating a lightweight and very strong main spar. The undercarriage legs were attached to pivot points built into the inner, rear section of the main spar, and retracted outwards and slightly backwards into wells in the non-load-carrying wing structure. The resultant narrow undercarriage track was considered an acceptable compromise as this reduced the bending loads on the main-spar during landing.

Ahead of the spar, the thick-skinned leading edge of the wing formed a strong and rigid, D-shaped box, which took most of the wing loads. At the time the wing was designed, this D-shaped leading edge was intended to house steam condensers for the evaporative cooling system intended for the PV-XII. Constant problems with the evaporative system in the Goshawk led to the adoption of a cooling system which used 100% glycol. The radiators were housed in a new radiator-duct designed by Fredrick Meredith of the Royal Aircraft Establishment (RAE) at Farnborough, Hampshire. This used the cooling air to generate thrust, greatly reducing the net drag produced by the radiators. In turn, the leading-edge structure lost its function as a condenser, but it was later adapted to house integral fuel tanks of various sizes— a feature patented by Vickers-Supermarine in 1938.
The airflow through the main radiator was controlled by pneumatic exit flaps. In early marks of the Spitfire (Mk I to Mk VI), the single flap was operated manually using a lever to the left of the pilot's seat. When the two-stage Merlin was introduced in the Spitfire Mk IX, the radiators were split to make room for an intercooler radiator; the radiator under the starboard wing was halved in size and the intercooler radiator housed alongside. Under the port wing, a new radiator fairing housed a square oil cooler alongside of the other half-radiator unit. The two radiator flaps were now operated automatically by a thermostat.

Another wing feature was its washout. The trailing edge of the wing twisted slightly upward along its span, the angle of incidence decreasing from +2° at its root to -½° at its tip. This caused the wing roots to stall before the tips, reducing tip-stall that could otherwise have resulted in a wing drop, often leading to a spin. As the wing roots started to stall, the separating air stream started to buffet (vibrate) the aircraft, warning the pilot, allowing even relatively inexperienced pilots to fly it to the limits of its performance. This washout was first featured in the wing of the Type 224, and became a consistent feature in subsequent designs leading to the Spitfire. The complex wing design, especially the precision required to manufacture the vital spar and leading-edge structures, caused some major delays in the production of the Spitfire at first. The problems increased when the work was put out to subcontractors, most of whom had never dealt with metal-structured, high-speed aircraft. By June 1939, most of these problems had been resolved, and production was no longer held up by a lack of wings.

All the main flight controls were originally metal structures with fabric covering. Designers and pilots felt that having ailerons which required a degree of effort to move at high speed would avoid unintended aileron reversal, throwing the aircraft around and potentially pulling the wings off. Air combat was also felt to take place at relatively low speeds and high-speed manoeuvring would be physically impossible. Flight tests showed the fabric covering of the ailerons "ballooned" at high speeds, adversely affecting the aerodynamics. Replacing the fabric covering with light alloy dramatically improved the ailerons at high speed. During the Battle of Britain, pilots found the Spitfire's ailerons were far too heavy at high speeds, severely restricting lateral manoeuvres such as rolls and high-speed turns, which were still a feature of air-to-air combat.

The Spitfire had detachable wing tips which were secured by two mounting points at the end of each main wing assembly. The wing tips used spruce formers for most of the internal structure with a light alloy skin attached using brass screws.

The light alloy split flaps at the trailing edge of the wing were also pneumatically operated via a finger lever on the instrument panel. Only two positions were available; fully up or fully down (85°). Flaps were normally lowered only during the final approach and for landing, and the pilot was to retract them before taxiing.

The ellipse also served as the design basis for the Spitfire's fin and tailplane assembly, once again exploiting the shape's favourable aerodynamic characteristics. Both the elevators and rudder were shaped so that their centre of mass was shifted forward, reducing control-surface flutter. The longer noses and greater propeller-wash resulting from larger engines in later models necessitated increasingly larger vertical, and later, horizontal tail surfaces to compensate for the altered aerodynamics, culminating in those of the Mk 22/24 series, which were 25% larger in area than those of the Mk I.

Improved late wing designs
As the Spitfire gained more power and was able to manoeuvre at higher speeds, the possibility that pilots would encounter aileron reversal increased, and the Supermarine design team set about redesigning the wings to counter this. The Royal Aircraft Establishment noted that, at  indicated airspeed, roughly 65% of aileron effectiveness was lost due to wing twist.

The new wing of the Spitfire F Mk 21 and its successors was designed to help alleviate this problem. Alongside the redesigned wing, Supermarine also experimented with the original wing, raising the leading edge by 1 inch (2.54 cm), with the hope of improving pilot view and reducing drag. This wing was tested on a modified F Mk 21, also called the F Mk 23, (sometimes referred to as "Valiant" rather than "Spitfire"). The increase in performance was minimal and this experiment was abandoned.

Supermarine developed a new laminar-flow wing based on new aerofoil profiles developed by the National Advisory Committee for Aeronautics in the United States, with the objective of reducing drag and improving performance. These laminar-flow airfoils were the Supermarine 371-I used at the root and the 371-II used at the tip. The new wing was initially fitted to a Spitfire Mk XIV. Later, a new fuselage was designed, with the new fighter becoming the Supermarine Spiteful.

Carburetion versus fuel injection
Early in its development, the Merlin engine's lack of fuel injection meant that Spitfires and Hurricanes, unlike the Bf 109E, were unable to simply nose down into a steep dive. This meant a Luftwaffe fighter could simply "bunt" into a high-power dive to escape an attack, leaving the Spitfire behind, as its fuel was forced out of the carburettor by negative "g". RAF fighter pilots soon learned to "half-roll" their aircraft before diving to pursue their opponents. Sir Stanley Hooker explained that the carburettor was adopted because it "increased the performance of the supercharger and thereby increased the power of the engine".

In March 1941, a metal disc with a hole was fitted in the fuel line, restricting fuel flow to the maximum the engine could consume. While it did not cure the problem of the initial fuel starvation in a dive, it did reduce the more serious problem of the carburettor being flooded with fuel by the fuel pumps under negative "g". Invented by Beatrice "Tilly" Shilling, it became known as "Miss Shilling's orifice". Further improvements were introduced throughout the Merlin series, with Bendix-manufactured pressure carburettors, designed to allow fuel to flow during all flight attitudes, introduced in 1942.

Armament

Due to a shortage of Brownings, which had been selected as the new standard rifle calibre machine gun for the RAF in 1934, early Spitfires were fitted with only four guns, with the other four fitted later. Early tests showed that, while the guns worked perfectly on the ground and at low altitudes, they tended to freeze at high altitude, especially the outer wing guns, because the RAF's Brownings had been modified to fire from an open bolt. While this prevented overheating of the cordite used in British ammunition, it allowed cold air to flow through the barrel unhindered. Supermarine did not fix the problem until October 1938, when they added hot air ducts from the rear of the wing-mounted radiators to the guns, and bulkheads around the gunbays to trap the hot air in the wing. Red fabric patches were doped over the gun ports to protect the guns from cold, dirt, and moisture until they were fired.

The decision on the arming of the Spitfire (and the Hurricane) is told in Captain C. H. Keith's book I Hold my Aim. Keith held various appointments with the RAF dealing with designing, development and technical policy of armament equipment. He organised a conference, with Air Commodore Tedder in the chair, on 19 July 1934. He says "I think it can be reasonably contended that the deliberations of that conference made possible, if not certain, of the winning of the Battle of Britain, almost exactly six years later". At that meeting, scientific officer Captain F. W. "Gunner" Hill presented charts based on his calculations showing that future fighters must carry no less than eight machine-guns, each of which must be capable of firing 1,000 shots a minute. Hill's assistant in making his calculations had been his teenage daughter.

Even if the eight Brownings worked perfectly, pilots soon discovered that they were not sufficient to destroy larger aircraft. Combat reports showed that an average of 4,500 rounds were needed to shoot down an enemy aircraft. In November 1938, tests against armoured and unarmoured targets had already indicated that the introduction of a weapon with a calibre of at least 20 mm was urgently needed. A variant on the Spitfire design with four 20 mm Oerlikon cannon had been tendered to specification F37/35, but the order for prototypes had gone to the Westland Whirlwind in January 1939.

In June 1939, a Spitfire was fitted with a drum-fed Hispano in each wing, an installation that required large blisters on the wing to cover the 60-round drum. The cannon suffered frequent stoppages, mostly because the guns were mounted on their sides to fit as much of the magazine as possible within the wing. In January 1940, P/O George Proudman flew this prototype in combat, but the starboard gun stopped after firing a single round, while the port gun fired 30 rounds before seizing. If one cannon seized, the recoil of the other threw the aircraft off aim.

Nevertheless, 30 more cannon-armed Spitfires were ordered for operational trials, and they were soon known as the Mk IB, to distinguish them from the Browning-armed Mk IA; they were delivered to No. 19 Squadron beginning in June 1940. The Hispanos were found to be so unreliable that the squadron requested an exchange of its aircraft with the older Browning-armed aircraft of an operational training unit. By August, Supermarine had perfected a more reliable installation with an improved feed mechanism and four .303s in the outer wing panels. The modified fighters were then delivered to 19 Squadron.

Operational history

Service operations

The operational history of the Spitfire with the RAF began with the first Mk Is K9789, which entered service with 19 Squadron at RAF Duxford on 4 August 1938. The Spitfire achieved legendary status during the Battle of Britain, a reputation aided by the "Spitfire Fund" organised and run by Lord Beaverbrook, the Minister of Aircraft Production.

In fact, the Hurricane outnumbered the Spitfire throughout the battle, and shouldered the burden of the defence against the Luftwaffe; however, because of its higher performance, the overall attrition rate of the Spitfire squadrons was lower than that of the Hurricane units, and the Spitfire units had a higher victory-to-loss ratio.

The key aim of Fighter Command was to stop the Luftwaffe's bombers; in practice, whenever possible, the tactic was to use Spitfires to counter German escort fighters, by then based in northern France, particularly the Bf 109s, while the Hurricane squadrons attacked the bombers.

Well-known Spitfire pilots included "Johnnie" Johnson—34 enemy aircraft (e/a) shot down—who flew the Spitfire right through his operational career from late 1940 to 1945. Douglas Bader (20 e/a) and "Bob" Tuck (27 e/a) flew Spitfires and Hurricanes during the major air battles of 1940. Both were shot down and became prisoners of war, while flying Spitfires over France in 1941 and 1942. "Paddy" Finucane (28–32 e/a) scored all his successes in the fighter before disappearing over the English Channel in July 1942. Some notable Commonwealth pilots were George Beurling (31 e/a) from Canada, "Sailor" Malan (27 e/a) from South Africa, New Zealanders Alan Deere (17 e/a) and C F Gray (27 e/a) and the Australian Hugo Armstrong (12 e/a).

The Spitfire continued to play increasingly diverse roles throughout the Second World War and beyond, often in air forces other than the RAF. For example, the Spitfire became the first high-speed photo-reconnaissance aircraft to be operated by the RAF. Sometimes unarmed, they flew at high, medium, and low altitudes, often ranging far into enemy territory to closely observe the Axis powers and provide an almost continual flow of valuable intelligence information throughout the war.

In 1941 and 1942, PRU Spitfires provided the first photographs of the Freya and Würzburg radar systems, and in 1943, helped confirm that the Germans were building the V1 and V2 Vergeltungswaffen ("vengeance weapons") rockets by photographing Peenemünde, on the Baltic Sea coast of Germany.

In the Mediterranean, the Spitfire blunted the heavy attacks on Malta by the Regia Aeronautica and Luftwaffe, and from early 1943, helped pave the way for the Allied invasions of Sicily and Italy. Those Spitfire Vs were the first to see service outside Britain.

The Spitfire also served on the Eastern Front with the Soviet Air Force (VVS). The first deliveries of the Spitfire Mk VB variant took place at the start of 1943, with the first batch of 35 aircraft delivered via sea to the city of Basra, Iraq. A total of 143 aircraft and 50 furnished hulls (to be used for spare parts) followed by March of the same year. Though some aircraft were used for front line duty in 1943, most of them saw service with the Protivo-Vozdushnaya Oborona (English: "Anti-air Defence Branch"). In 1944, the USSR received the substantially improved Mk IX variant, with the first aircraft delivered in February. Initially, these were refurbished aircraft, but subsequent shipments were factory new. A total of 1,185 aircraft of this model were delivered through Iran, Iraq and the Arctic to northern Soviet ports. Two of these were the Spitfire HF Mk IX (high-altitude modification) while the remainder were the low-altitude LF Mk IX. The last Lend-Lease shipment carrying the Mk IX arrived at the port of Severodvinsk on 12 June 1945.

The Spitfire also served in the Pacific Theatre, meeting the Japanese Mitsubishi A6M Zero. Lt. Gen. Claire Chennault said: "The RAF pilots were trained in methods that were excellent against German and Italian equipment, but suicide against the acrobatic Japs." Although not as fast as the Spitfire, the Zero could out-turn the Spitfire, could sustain a climb at a very steep angle, and could stay in the air for three times as long. To counter the Zero, Spitfire pilots adopted a "slash and run" policy and used their faster speed and diving superiority to fight, while avoiding turning dogfights. The Allies achieved air superiority when the Mk VIII version was introduced to the theatre, replacing the earlier Mk V. In one memorable encounter, New Zealand ace Alan Peart fought a solo dogfight against two dozen Japanese aircraft attacking the Broadway airstrip, shooting down one.

That Southeast Asia was a lower-priority area also did not help, and it was allocated few Spitfires and other modern fighters compared to Europe, which allowed the Japanese to easily achieve air superiority by 1942. Over the Northern Territory of Australia, Royal Australian Air Force and RAF Spitfires assigned to No. 1 Wing RAAF helped defend the port town of Darwin against air attack by the Japanese Naval Air Force, suffering heavy losses largely due to the type's limited fuel capacity. Spitfire MKVIIIs took part in the last battle of World War II involving the Western allies in Burma, in the ground attack role, helping defeat a Japanese break-out attempt.

During the Second World War, Spitfires were used by the United States Army Air Forces in the 4th Fighter Group until they were replaced by Republic P-47 Thunderbolts in March 1943.

Several Spitfires were captured by the Germans and flown by units that tested, evaluated, and sometimes clandestinely operated enemy aircraft.

Speed and altitude records

Beginning in late 1943, high-speed diving trials were undertaken at Farnborough to investigate the handling characteristics of aircraft travelling at speeds near the sound barrier (i.e., the onset of compressibility effects). Because it had the highest limiting Mach number of any aircraft at that time, a Spitfire XI was chosen to take part in these trials. Due to the high altitudes necessary for these dives, a fully feathering Rotol propeller was fitted to prevent overspeeding. During these trials, EN409, flown by Squadron Leader J. R. Tobin, reached  (Mach 0.891) in a 45° dive.

In April 1944, the same aircraft suffered engine failure in another dive while being flown by Squadron Leader Anthony F. Martindale, Royal Air Force Volunteer Reserve, when the propeller and reduction gear broke off. The dive put the aircraft to Mach 0.92, the fastest ever recorded in a piston-engined aircraft, but when the propeller came off, the Spitfire, now tail-heavy, zoom-climbed back to altitude. Martindale blacked out under the 11 g loading, but when he resumed consciousness, he found the aircraft at about 40,000 feet with its (originally straight) wings now slightly swept back. Martindale successfully glided the Spitfire  back to the airfield and landed safely. Martindale was awarded the Air Force Cross for his exploits.

RAE Bedford (RAE) modified a Spitfire for high-speed testing of the stabilator (then known as the "flying tail") of the Miles M.52 supersonic research aircraft. RAE test pilot Eric Brown stated that he tested this successfully during October and November 1944, attaining Mach 0.86 in a dive.

On 5 February 1952, a Spitfire 19 of 81 Squadron based at Kai Tak in Hong Kong reached probably the highest altitude ever achieved by a Spitfire. The pilot, Flight Lieutenant Edward "Ted" Powles, was on a routine flight to survey outside air temperature and report on other meteorological conditions at various altitudes in preparation for a proposed new air service through the area. The cabin pressure fell below a safe level, and in trying to reduce altitude, he entered an uncontrollable dive which shook the aircraft violently. He eventually regained control somewhere below  and landed safely with no discernible damage to his aircraft.

The critical Mach number of the Spitfire's original elliptical wing was higher than the subsequently used laminar-flow section, straight-tapering-planform wing of the follow-on Supermarine Spiteful, Seafang, and Attacker, illustrating that Reginald Mitchell's practical engineering approach to the problems of high-speed flight had paid off.

Variants

Overview

Although R. J. Mitchell is justifiably known as the engineer who designed the Spitfire, his premature death in 1937 meant that all development after that date was undertaken by a team led by his chief draughtsman, Joe Smith, who became Supermarine's chief designer on Mitchell's death. As Jeffrey Quill noted: "If Mitchell was born to design the Spitfire, Joe Smith was born to defend and develop it."

There were 24 marks of Spitfire and many sub-variants. These covered the Spitfire in development from the Merlin to Griffon engines, the high-speed photo-reconnaissance variants and the different wing configurations. More Spitfire Mk Vs were built than any other type, with 6,487 built, followed by the 5,656 Mk IXs. Different wings, featuring a variety of weapons, were fitted to most marks; the A wing used eight .303 in (7.7 mm) machine guns, the B wing had four .303 in (7.7 mm) machine guns and two 20 mm (.79 in) Hispano cannon, and the C, or universal, wing could mount either four 20 mm (.79 in) cannon or two 20 mm (.79 in) and four .303 in (7.7 mm) machine guns. As the war progressed, the C wing became more common. Another armament variation was the E wing which housed two 20 mm (.79 in) cannon and two .50 in (12.7 mm) Browning machine guns. Although the Spitfire continued to improve in speed and armament, its limited fuel capacity restricted range and endurance: it remained "short-legged" throughout its life except in the dedicated photo-reconnaissance role, when its guns were replaced by extra fuel tanks.

Supermarine developed a two-seat variant, known as the T Mk VIII, to be used for training, but none were ordered, and only one example was ever constructed (identified as N32/G-AIDN by Supermarine). In the absence of an official two-seater variant, a number of airframes were crudely converted in the field. These included a 4 Squadron SAAF Mk VB in North Africa, where a second seat was fitted instead of the upper fuel tank in front of the cockpit, although it was not a dual-control aircraft, and is thought to have been used as the squadron "run-about". The only unofficial two-seat conversions that were fitted with dual-controls were a few Russian lend/lease Mk IX aircraft. These were referred to as Mk IX UTI and differed from the Supermarine proposals by using an inline "greenhouse" style double canopy rather than the raised "bubble" type of the T Mk VIII.

In the postwar era, the idea was revived by Supermarine and a number of two-seat Spitfires were built by converting old Mk IX airframes with a second "raised" cockpit featuring a bubble canopy. Ten of these TR9 variants were then sold to the Indian Air Force along with six to the Irish Air Corps, three to the Royal Netherlands Air Force and one for the Royal Egyptian Air Force. Currently several of the trainers are known to exist, including both the T Mk VIII, a T Mk IX based in the US, and the "Grace Spitfire" ML407, a veteran flown operationally by 485(NZ) Squadron in 1944.

Seafire

The Seafire, a name derived from sea, and Spitfire, was a naval version of the Spitfire specially adapted for operation from aircraft carriers. Although the Spitfire was not designed for the rough-and-tumble of carrier-deck operations, it was considered the best available fighter at the time. The basic Spitfire design did impose some limitations on the use of the aircraft as a carrier-based fighter; poor visibility over the nose, for example, meant that pilots had to be trained to land with their heads out of the cockpit and looking along the port cowling of their Seafire. Like the Spitfire, the Seafire also had a relatively narrow undercarriage track, which meant that it was not ideally suited to deck operations. Early Seafire marks had relatively few modifications to the standard Spitfire airframe; however cumulative front line experience meant that most of the later versions of the Seafire had strengthened airframes, folding wings, arrestor hooks and other modifications, culminating in the purpose-built Seafire F/FR Mk 47.

The Seafire II was able to outperform the A6M5 Zero at low altitudes when the two types were tested against each other during wartime mock combat exercises. However, contemporary Allied carrier fighters such as the F6F Hellcat and F4U Corsair were considerably more robust and so more practical for carrier operations. Performance was greatly increased when later versions of the Seafire were fitted with the Griffon engines. These were too late to see service in World War II.

Griffon-engined variants

The first Rolls-Royce Griffon-engined Mk XII flew in August 1942, and first flew operationally with 41 Squadron in April 1943.

As American fighters took over the long-range escorting of USAAF daylight bombing raids, the Griffon-engined Spitfires progressively took up the tactical air superiority role, and played a major role in intercepting V-1 flying bombs, while the Merlin-engined variants (mainly the Mk IX and the Packard-engined Mk XVI) were adapted to the fighter-bomber role. Although the later Griffon-engined marks lost some of the favourable handling characteristics of their Merlin-powered predecessors, they could still outmanoeuvre their main German foes and other, later, American and British-designed fighters.

The final version of the Spitfire, the Mk 24, first flew at South Marston on 13 April 1946. On 20 February 1948, almost twelve years from the prototype's first flight, the last production Spitfire, VN496, left the production line. Spitfire Mk 24s were used by only one regular RAF unit, with 80 Squadron replacing their Hawker Tempests with F Mk 24s in 1947. With these aircraft, 80 Squadron continued its patrol and reconnaissance duties from Wunstorf in Germany as part of the occupation forces, until it relocated to Kai Tak Airport, Hong Kong, in July 1949. During the Chinese Civil War, 80 Squadron's main duty was to defend Hong Kong from perceived Communist threats.

Operation Firedog during the Malayan Emergency saw the Spitfire fly over 1,800 operational sorties against the Malayan Communists. The last operational sortie of an RAF Spitfire was flown on 1 April 1954, by PS888 a PR Mk 19 Spitfire of 81 Squadron.It was flying from RAF Seletar, in Singapore to photograph an area of jungle in Johore, Malaysia, thought to contain Communist guerrillas. To mark the special occasion, ground crewmen had painted 'The Last' on the aircraft's nose.

The last non-operational flight of a Spitfire in RAF service, which took place on 9 June 1957, was by a PR Mk 19, PS583, from RAF Woodvale of the Temperature and Humidity Flight. This was also the last known flight of a piston-engined fighter in the RAF. The last nation in the Middle East to operate Spitfires was Syria, which kept its F Mk 22s until 1953.

In late 1962, Air Marshal Sir John Nicholls instigated a trial when he flew Spitfire PM631, a PR Mk 19 in the custody of the Battle of Britain Memorial Flight, against an English Electric Lightning F 3 (a supersonic jet-engined interceptor) in mock combat at RAF Binbrook. At the time, British Commonwealth forces were involved in possible action against Indonesia over Malaya and Nicholls decided to develop tactics to fight the Indonesian Air Force P-51 Mustang, a fighter that had a similar performance to the PR Mk 19. The first airframe (PM631) developed mechanical issues which removed it from the trial. Another PR Mk 19, PS853, which is now owned by Rolls-Royce, was on gate-guard duties at Binbrook, having been retired from the Battle of Britain Memorial Flight (BBMF) one year before. It had been maintained in running condition by ground crews at Binbrook, and after a short time was participating in the trials. At the end of the trials, RAF pilots found that Firestreak infra-red guided missiles had trouble acquiring the Spitfire due to a low exhaust temperature, and decided that the twin ADEN  cannons were the only weapons suited to the task, which was complicated by the tight turning circle of the Spitfire, and the Lightning's proclivity for over-running the Spitfire. It was concluded that the most effective and safest way for a modern jet-engined fighter to attack a piston-engined fighter was to engage full afterburner at an altitude lower than the Spitfire, and circle behind it to perform a hit-and-run attack, contrary to all established fighter-on-fighter doctrine at that time.

Operators

 
 
 
 
 
 
 
 
 
 
 
 
  Indian Empire
 
 
 
 
  (Italian Republic)

Surviving aircraft

There are 54 Spitfires and a few Seafires in airworthy condition worldwide, although many air museums have examples on static display, for example, Chicago's Museum of Science and Industry has paired a static Spitfire with a static Ju 87 R-2/Trop. Stuka dive bomber.

The oldest surviving Spitfire is a Mark 1, serial number K9942; it is preserved at the Royal Air Force Museum Cosford in Shropshire. This aircraft was the 155th built and first flew in April 1939. It flew operationally with No. 72 Squadron RAF until June 1940, when it was damaged in a wheels-up landing. After repair, it was used for training until August 1944, when it became one of several Battle of Britain aircraft veterans that were allocated to the Air Historical Branch for future museum preservation.

What may be the most originally restored Spitfire in the world is maintained at Fantasy of Flight in Polk City, Florida. Over a six-year period in the 1990s, this aircraft was slowly restored by Personal Plane Services in England using almost 90% of its original aircraft skins. Owner Kermit Weeks insisted that the aircraft be restored as closely as possible to its original condition. Machine guns, cannon, gun sight and original working radios are all installed.

Two MK 1 Supermarine Spitfires, originally restored by the Aircraft Restoration Company, remain in flying condition at the Imperial War Museum Duxford, in Cambridgeshire, England. Both restored by American billionaire Thomas Kaplan, one has been donated to the Imperial War Museum and the second was auctioned in July 2015 at Christie's, London. It is one of only four flying MK 1 Spitfires in the world. The aircraft fetched a record £3.1 million at auction on 9 July, beating the previous record for a Spitfire of £1.7 million set in 2009.

Imperial War Museum Duxford, Cambridgeshire, is home to the largest collection of Spitfires, with 15-20 airworthy and static examples on site most weeks throughout the year. It is also rumoured that there is anywhere from 5 to 10 restoration projects also progressing on site between The Fighter Collection and the Aircraft Restoration Company. 

One Spitfire is kept in airworthy condition in the Israeli Air Force Museum.

A Spitfire model ML407 was purchased by Carolyn Grace and her husband Nick in 1979. Carolyn Grace subsequently flew the Spitfire in several displays, including one commemorating the 60th anniversary of D-Day in 2004.

Search for reported surviving Spitfires in Burma

After hostilities ceased in Asia in 1945, a number of Spitfire Mk.XIVs were reportedly buried, after being greased, tarred and prepared for long-term storage, in crates in Burma.

Excavations carried out at Yangon International Airport (formerly RAF Mingaladon) in early 2013 failed to locate any of the rumoured aircraft, and the team reported that they found no evidence that Spitfires were shipped there in crates or buried. Pat Woodward, who was an RAF pilot operating from Burma at the end of the war, reported that no such burying took place. In 2016 it was reported that the hunt was continuing.

Memorials 
 A fibreglass replica of the Mk.1 Spitfire Mk1 YT-J (R6675), flown by Supermarine test pilot Jeffrey Quill during his brief period of active service with 65 Squadron, is on display at the Battle of Britain memorial at Capel-le-Ferne near Folkestone, along with a replica Mk.1 Hurricane representing US-X, in which Pilot Officer Geoffrey Page was shot down on 12 August 1940.
 Sentinel is a sculpture by Tim Tolkien depicting three Spitfires in flight at the roundabout junction (popularly known as Spitfire Island) of the A47 and A452 in Castle Bromwich, Birmingham, England, commemorating the main Spitfire factory. The island sits at the adjoining southern corners of the former Castle Bromwich Aircraft Factory and Aerodrome (now Castle Vale housing estate). There is also a Spitfire and a Hurricane in the nearby Thinktank Science Museum.
 A sculpture of the prototype Spitfire, K5054 stands on the roundabout at the entrance to Southampton International Airport, which, as Eastleigh Aerodrome, saw the first flight of the aircraft in March 1936.
 Jeffrey Quill, the former Supermarine test pilot, initiated a project to build an exact replica of K5054, the prototype Spitfire to be put on permanent public display as a memorial to R.J. Mitchell. A team of original Supermarine designers worked with Aerofab Restorations of Andover for 10 years to create the facsimile. It was unveiled to the public in April 1993 by Quill at the RAF Museum, Hendon, and is currently on loan to the Tangmere Military Aviation Museum.
 A fibreglass replica in the colours of a Polish squadron leader based at the station during the Second World War is on display at RAF Northolt, the last Battle of Britain Sector Station still in RAF operational service.
 A replica Spitfire is on display on the Thornaby Road roundabout near the school named after Sir Douglas Bader who flew a Spitfire in the Second World War. This memorial is in memory of the old RAF base in Thornaby which is now a residential estate.
 A fibreglass replica of a Spitfire Mk XVI has been mounted on a pylon in Memorial Park, Hamilton, New Zealand as a tribute to all New Zealand fighter pilots who flew Spitfires during the Second World War.
 At Bentley Priory, the Second World War command centre for Fighter Command, fibreglass replicas of a Spitfire Mk 1 and a Hurricane Mk 1 can be seen fixed in a position of attack. This was built as a memorial to everyone who worked at Bentley Priory during the war.
 A fibreglass replica in the colours of 603 (City of Edinburgh) Squadron Royal Auxiliary Air Force Spitfire Memorial sits next to the Edinburgh Airport control tower. This model replaced the original gate guardian from the former RAF Turnhouse. It is painted to represent serial number L1067 (code XT-D) "Blue Peter", the personal aircraft of the squadron's commander, Squadron Leader George Denholm DFC.
 A fibreglass replica of a Spitfire Mk IX has been mounted on a pylon in Jackson Park, Windsor, Ontario alongside a Hurricane as a memorial to Royal Canadian Air Force pilots. This display replaces an Avro Lancaster bomber that had previously been on display and is currently undergoing restoration.
 One of the few remaining Supermarine Spitfires with a wartime record is on display (alongside a Hawker Hurricane) at the RAF Manston Spitfire and Hurricane Memorial Museum, near Kent International Airport.
 Lodge Hill Garage, Abingdon, Oxfordshire has a full-size replica Spitfire as a rooftop monument. Owner Peter Jewson bought the replica in a campaign to build the first ever national memorial to honour the 166 women from the Air Transport Auxiliary (ATA) who flew Spitfires and other aircraft from factories to their operational airbases; 14 died during these ferry flights.
 A fibreglass replica of a Spitfire Mk IX is mounted to the roof of the speciality shop, Spitfire Emporium, in Kitchener, Ontario.
 There is a replica of a Spitfire (and of a Hurricane) at the entrance to the Eden Camp Modern History Museum as a memorial to pilots who served in the Battle of Britain.
 Montrose Air Station Heritage Centre has a full-size replica Spitfire MkVb LO-D (EP121) on display as a memorial to the men and women who served at RFC/RAF Montrose.
 A fibreglass replica of Spitfire VB BL924 is on display at Beale Park. It was built as a tribute to Aksel [Axel] Andreas Svendsen, a young Danish RAF pilot who was killed in action on 24 April 1942.
 A full-size pole-mounted replica was erected in 2021 on the site of a Salisbury factory.
 In 2009, the Spitfire was selected by the Royal Mail for their "British Design Classics" commemorative postage stamp issue.

Restorations and replicas

British organisation, the Aircraft Restoration Company (Formally Historic Flying Limited), has either restored, overhauled or built from scratch a significant proportion of the Spitfires that are now airworthy. Several other manufacturers have produced replica Spitfires, either as complete aircraft or as kits for self-building. These range in scale from 60% scale to full-size, and most use wooden construction rather than the original all-metal monocoque design. These include the Jurca Spit from France, and those manufactured by Tally Ho Enterprises in Canada. Supermarine Aircraft – originally from Brisbane, Australia, and now based in Cisco, Texas – manufacture the 80% scale Spitfire Mk26 and the 90% scale Mk26B replicas. Their Supermarine Aircraft Spitfire is supplied in kit form and is the only all-aluminium reproduction Spitfire in production. The Isaacs Spitfire (1975) and the Time Warp Spitfire Mk V (1996) are homebuilt 60% scale replicas, and Bob DeFord of Prescott, Arizona built and flies a 100% scale replica.

Greenwood Military Aviation Museum is also home to a replica non-flying Spitfire.

Notable appearances in media

During and after the Battle of Britain, the Spitfire became a symbol of British resistance: for example, Lord Beaverbrook's "Spitfire Fund" of 1940 was one campaign which drew widespread public attention to the Spitfire. The Spitfire continues to be highly popular at airshows, on airfields and in museums worldwide, and holds an important place in the memories of many people, especially the few still living who flew the Spitfire in combat. Numerous films and documentaries featuring the Spitfire are still being produced, some of which are listed in this section.
 The First of the Few (also known as Spitfire in the US and Canada) (1942) is a British film produced and directed by Leslie Howard, with Howard in the starring role of R. J. Mitchell, and David Niven playing a composite character based on the Schneider Trophy pilots of 1927, 1929 and 1931, and the Supermarine test pilot Jeffrey Quill. Some of the footage includes film shot in 1941 of operational Spitfires and pilots of 501 Squadron (code letters SD). Howard spent a long time researching the history of the Spitfire's development for the film; Mrs. Mitchell and her son Gordon were on the set during much of the production. The aerobatic flying sequences featured in the last 15 minutes of the film were made by Jeffrey Quill in early November 1941, flying a Spitfire Mk II mocked up to represent the prototype.
 Malta Story (1953), starring Alec Guinness, Jack Hawkins, Anthony Steel and Muriel Pavlow, is a black and white war film telling the story of the defence of Malta in 1942 when Spitfires were the island's main defence from air attacks.
 Reach for the Sky (1956) starring Kenneth More tells the story of Douglas Bader, using contemporary Spitfire aircraft in the production.
 Battle of Britain (1969) directed by Guy Hamilton and starring Laurence Olivier, Michael Caine, Christopher Plummer, Ralph Richardson, Michael Redgrave and Susannah York, is set in 1940. Features several sequences involving a total of 12 flying Spitfires (mostly Mk IX versions because not many Mk.Is were available at the time), as well as a number of other flying examples of Second World War-era British and German aircraft.
 Piece of Cake (1987) starring Tom Burlinson, aired on the ITV network in 1987. Based on the novel by Derek Robinson, the six-part miniseries covers the prewar era to "Battle of Britain Day", 15 September 1940. It depicts air combat over the skies of France and Britain during the early stages of the Second World War, though using five flying examples of late model Spitfires in place of the novel's early model Hurricanes.
 Dark Blue World (2001), starring Ondřej Vetchý, is a tale of two Czech pilots who escape Nazi-occupied Europe to fly Spitfires during the Battle of Britain. Jan Svěrák filmed some new aerial scenes and reused aerial footage from Hamilton's film.
 Guy Martin's Spitfire (2014) is a Channel 4 documentary covering the two-year restoration of a Mark 1 Spitfire, N3200, coded 'QV', that had been buried beneath the sand for 46 years after crash landing during the Dunkirk evacuation in 1940. Guy Martin tells the Boy's Own-style story of its pilot, Squadron Leader Geoffrey Stephenson and helps in the restoration of the aircraft at the Aircraft Restoration Company facilities at Duxford.
 Dunkirk (2017), directed by Christopher Nolan, features three Spitfires defending the evacuation of British and French troops from Dunkirk against attacks by the German Luftwaffe.
 Spitfire: The People's Plane (2020) is a BBC World Service ten-part podcast on the efforts of the people who built the aircraft.

Specifications (Spitfire Mk Vb) 

The Spitfire's performance improved greatly as WWII progressed; for more information, see Supermarine Spitfire variants: specifications, performance and armament.

See also

Notes

Citations

Bibliography 

 Ackroyd, John. "The Aerodynamics of the Spitfire". Journal of Aeronautical History (2016) 20#1:59–86
 Air Ministry. A.P 1565B Spitfire IIA and IIB Aeroplanes: Merlin XII Engine, Pilot's Notes. London: Air Data Publications, 1972. .
 Air Ministry. Pilot's Notes for Spitfire, IX XI & XVI. Merlin 61, 63, 66, 70 or 266 Engine. London: Air Data Publications, 1946. 
 Andrews, C.F. and E.B. Morgan. Supermarine Aircraft since 1914. London: Putnam, 1987. .
 Bader, Douglas. Fight for the Sky: The Story of the Spitfire and Hurricane. London: Cassell Military Books, 2004. .
 Bodie, Warren M. The Lockheed P-38 Lightning: The Definitive Story of Lockheed's P-38 Fighter. Hayesville, North Carolina: Widewing Publications, 2001, first edition 1991. .
 Bowyer, Chaz. Supermarine Spitfire. London, Arms and Armour Press, 1980. .
 Bowyer, Michael. Interceptor Fighters for the Royal Air Force 1935–45. Wellingborough, UK: Patrick Stevens, 1984. .
 Brown, Eric. "Spitfires with Sea Legs, Part two." Air International, Vol. 15, No. 4, October 1978.
 Bungay, Stephen. The Most Dangerous Enemy: A History of the Battle of Britain. London: Aurum, 2001. .
 Buttler, Tony. British Secret Projects: Fighters and Bombers 1935–1950. Hersham, UK: Midland, 2004. .
 Carpenter, Chris. Flightwise: Part 1, Principles of Aircraft Flight. Shrewsbury, UK: AirLife, 1996. .
 Cross, Roy and Gerald Scarborough. Messerschmitt Bf 109, Versions B-E. London: Patrick Stevens, 1976. .
 Cull, Brian with Fredrick Galea. Spitfires Over Malta: The Epic Air Battles of 1942. London: Grub Street, 2005. .
 Danel, Raymond and Jean Cuny. Docavia n°4: le Dewoitine D.520 . Paris, France: Editions Larivière, 1966.
 Deere, Brendon. Spitfire: Return to Flight. Palmerston North, NZ: ITL Aviation Limited, 2010. .
 Deighton, Len. Fighter: The True Story of the Battle of Britain. London: Grafton 1977. .
 Delve, Ken. The Story of the Spitfire: An Operational and Combat History. London: Greenhill books, 2007. .
 Dibbs, John and Tony Holmes. Spitfire: Flying Legend. Southampton, UK: Osprey Publishing, 1997. . 
 Eforgan, Estel. Leslie Howard: The Lost Actor. London: Mitchell Vallentine & Company, 2010. .
 Ethell, Jeffrey L. World War II in the Air. Annapolis, Maryland: Naval Institute Press, 1994. .
 Ethell, Jeffrey L. and Steve Pace. Spitfire. St. Paul, Minnesota: Motorbooks International, 1997. .
 Flack, Jeremy. Spitfire – The World's Most Famous Fighter. London: Chancellor Press, 1994. .
 Flintham, Victor. Air Wars and Aircraft: A Detailed Record of Air Combat, 1945 to the Present. New York: Facts on File, 1990. .
 Gerdessen, Frederik. "Estonian Air Power 1918–1945". Air Enthusiast, No. 18, April–July 1982. pp. 61–76. .
 Gilman J.D. and J. Clive. KG 200. London: Pan Books Ltd., 1978. 
 Glancey, Jonathan. Spitfire: The Illustrated Biography. London: Atlantic Books, 2006. .
 Green, Peter. "Spitfire Against a Lightning". Flypast, No. 315, October 2007.
 Green, William. Famous Fighters of the Second World War, 3rd ed. New York: Doubleday, 1975. .
 Green, William. Messerschmitt Bf 109: The Augsburg Eagle; A Documentary History. London: Macdonald and Jane's Publishing Group Ltd., 1980. .
 Green, William and Gordon Swanborough. The Great Book of Fighters. St. Paul, Minnesota: MBI Publishing, 2001. .
 Gueli, Marco. "Spitfire con Coccarde Italiane (Spitfire in Italian service)." (in Italian) Storia Militare n. 62, November 1998.
 Gunston, Bill et al. "Supermarine unveils its high-performance monoplane today (5 March)." The Chronicle of Aviation. Liberty, Missouri: JL International Publishing, 1992. .
 Henshaw, Alex. Sigh for a Merlin: Testing the Spitfire: 2nd Revised edition . London: Crecy Publishing, 1999. .
 Henshaw, Alex. "Spitfire: A Test Pilot's Defence." Aeroplane Monthly, Vol. 9, Issue No. 269, September 1995.
 Holland, James. Fortress Malta: An Island Under Siege, 1940–1943. New York: Miramax Books, 2003. .
 Holmes, Tony. Spitfire vs Bf 109: Battle of Britain. London: Osprey Aerospace, 2007. 
 Jackson, Robert. Aircraft of World War II: Development, Weaponry, Specifications. Edison, New Jersey: Chartwell Books, 2003. .
 Jane, Fred T. "The Supermarine Spitfire." Jane's Fighting Aircraft of World War II. London: Studio, 1946. .
 Jane, Fred T. Jane's Fighting Aircraft of World War II (repr). New York: Crescent Books, 1998. .
 Keith, C.H. I Hold My Aim. George, Allen and Unwin Ltd, London, 1946.
 Lednicer, David A. "Technical Note: A CFD Evaluation of Three Prominent World War II Fighter Aircraft." Aeronautical Journal, Royal Aeronautical Society, June/July 1995.
 Lednicer, David A. "World War II Fighter Aerodynamics." EAA Sport Aviation, January 1999.
 
 McKinstry, Leo. Spitfire: Portrait of a Legend. London: John Murray, 2007. .
 Morgan, Eric B. and Edward Shacklady. Spitfire: The History (4th rev. edn.). London: Key Publishing, 1993. .
 Morgan, Eric B. and Edward Shacklady. Spitfire: The History (5th rev. edn.). London: Key Publishing, 2000. .
 Morison, Samuel Eliot. Breaking the Bismarcks Barrier. History of United States Naval Operations in World War II, Volume 6. Castle Books, 1958. 
 Moss, Graham and Barry McKee. Spitfires and Polished Metal: Restoring the Classic Fighter. Marlborough, Wiltshire, UK: Airlife, 1999. .
 Price, Alfred. "The Birth of a Thoroughbred." Aeroplane, Volume 34, Number 3, No. 395, March 2006.
 Price, Alfred. Late Marque Spitfire Aces 1942–1945. Oxford, UK: Osprey Publishing, 1995. .
 Price, Alfred. Spitfire: A Documentary History. London: Macdonald and Jane's, 1977. .
 Price, Alfred. Spitfire a Complete Fighting History. Enderby, Leicester, UK: The Promotional Reprint Company Limited, 1991. .
 Price, Alfred. The Spitfire Story. London: Jane's Publishing Company Ltd., 1982. .
 Price, Alfred. The Spitfire Story: Second edition. London: Arms and Armour Press Ltd., 1986. .
 Price, Alfred. Spitfire: Fighter Supreme. London: Arms and Armour Press, 1991. .
 Price, Alfred. "Supermarine Spitfire (Merlin-engined variants)". Wings of Fame, Volume 9, 1997, pp. 30–93. London: Aerospace. .
 Price, Alfred. "Supermarine Spitfire (Griffon-engined variants and Seafire)" Wings of Fame, Volume 16, 1999, pp. 30–85. London: Aerospace. .
 Price, Alfred. The Spitfire Story: New edited edition. London: Weidenfeld Military, 1999. .
 Price, Alfred. The Spitfire Story: Revised second edition. Enderby, Leicester, UK: Siverdale Books, 2002. .
 Price, Alfred and Mike Spick. Handbook of Great Aircraft of WW II. Enderby, Leicester, UK: The Promotional Reprint Company Limited, 1997. .
 Quill, Jeffrey. Birth of a Legend: The Spitfire. London: Quiller Press, 1986. .
 Quill, Jeffrey. Spitfire: A Test Pilot's Story. London: John Murray, 1983, New edition: Crecy Publishing 1996, reprinted 1998, 2001, 2005, 2008. 
 Rearden, Jim. Koga's Zero: The Fighter That Changed World War II. , second edition, Missoula, Montana: Pictorial Histories Publishing Company, 1995. Originally published as Cracking the Zero Mystery: How the US Learned to Beat Japan's Vaunted WWII Fighter Plane .
 Shores, Christopher and Brian Cull with Nicola Malizia. Malta: The Spitfire Year. London: Grub Street, 1991. .
 Smallwood, Hugh. Spitfire in Blue. London: Osprey Aerospace, 1996. .
 Spick, Mike. Supermarine Spitfire. New York: Gallery Books, 1990. .
 "Spitfire: Simply Superb, Part three." Air International, Volume 28, Number 4, April 1985.
 Stokes, Doug. Paddy Finucane, Fighter Ace: A Biography of Wing Commander Brendan E. Finucane, D.S.O., D.F.C. and Two Bars. London: William Kimber & Co. Ltd., 1983. .
 Tanner, John. The Spitfire V Manual (AP1565E reprint). London: Arms and Armour Press, 1981. .
 Vader, John. Spitfire (Ballantine's Illustrated History of World War II). London: Ballantine's Books, 1969.
 
 Williams, Anthony G. and Dr. Emmanuel Gustin. Flying Guns: World War II. Shrewsbury, UK: Airlife Publishing, 2003. .

External links 

 The Spitfire Site – resource library about the Supermarine Spitfire 
 Spitfire Society
 Spitfire Society – Eastern Wing
 Spitfire/Seafire Serial Numbers, production contracts and aircraft histories
 K5054 – Supermarine Type 300 prototype Spitfire & production aircraft history
 Spitfire Performance Testing
 Supermarine Spitfire – History of a legend (RAF Museum)
 The Supermarine Spitfire in Indian Air Force Service
 Spitfire Pilots, articles about Spitfires and its pilots
 RAF Museum Spitfire Mk VB walk-around photos 
 Examples of Photographic Reconnaissance Spitfires
 Pacific Spitfires – The Supermarine Spitfire in RAAF Service
 A photograph of the 1939 "Speed Spitfire" in Flight.

 
Aircraft first flown in 1936
1930s British fighter aircraft
Carrier-based aircraft
Low-wing aircraft
Single-engined tractor aircraft
Retractable conventional landing gear
Spitfire